John Conant Flansburgh (born May 6, 1960) is an American musician. He is half of the long-standing Brooklyn, New York-based alternative rock duo They Might Be Giants with John Linnell, for which he writes, sings, and plays rhythm guitar.

Commonly referred to by the nickname "Flansy" or "Flans", he is married to musician Robin Goldwasser, with whom he occasionally performs.

Early life
Flansburgh was born in Lexington, Massachusetts. His father, Earl Flansburgh, was a well-known Boston architect. His mother, Polly Flansburgh, is the founder and president of Boston By Foot. Her father, Brigadier General Ralph Hospital, was an artillery commander in the U.S. Army in the Italian Campaign during World War II. His brother, Paxus Calta (born Earl Schuyler Flansburgh), is an anti-nuclear activist and political organizer.

Flansburgh attended the George Washington University, where he learned to play guitar while working as a parking garage attendant, then Antioch College and Pratt Institute, where he graduated with an arts degree.

1982–present: They Might Be Giants
Flansburgh co-founded They Might Be Giants, with longtime friend John Linnell, in 1982 while a student at Pratt Institute. The two share singing and songwriting duties, with Flansburgh on guitar, in addition to performing a variety of instruments when the need arises. In the 2002 documentary Gigantic (A Tale of Two Johns), he was described as holding a leadership role in the group, managing most details of their live act and handling much of the promotion effort.

As a songwriter, Flansburgh enjoys a mix of styles; many of his songs have an absurdist and satirical bent, but he often breaks for more earnest and romantic themes as well. He penned and performed vocals on the group's first Grammy Award-winning effort, "Boss of Me", which charted in Europe and served as theme song to the hit television series Malcolm in the Middle.

Side projects

Flansburgh has pursued a number of solo projects during his time with They Might Be Giants. His band Mono Puff recorded two full-length albums and four EPs in the late 1990s and toured occasionally. The band also included bassist Hal Cragin and drummer Steve Calhoon, plus various guest collaborators.

Flansburgh also ran a subscription-based record label called the Hello Recording Club. Flansburgh has also directed music videos for such artists as Soul Coughing, Ben Folds Five, Frank Black and the Catholics, Harvey Danger, and Jonathan Coulton. He also produced Coulton's album, Artificial Heart. In 2004, as a one-off, Flansburgh produced and starred in the Off-Broadway musical People Are Wrong!, which was co-written by his wife, Robin Goldwasser.

In 1998, Flansburgh guest-starred as himself in the season 4 finale of the Cartoon Network animated series Space Ghost Coast to Coast. In 2004, Flansburgh created and hosted a series on WNYC entitled Now Hear This. The program spotlighted a variety of his musical interests, featuring interviews with artists such as Stephin Merritt, David Byrne, Matt Stone, and The Darkness. While no longer in production, it continues to be archived on the station's website. In 2007, Flansburgh played a short role as "Computer" in the Adult Swim comedy series Xavier: Renegade Angel.

Personal life
Since 1996, he is married to musician Robin Goldwasser, with whom he occasionally performs. Flansburgh considers himself politically liberal and has spoken of his support for Bernie Sanders for President. Flansburgh is left-handed.

On June 8, 2022, while in a ride share on his way home from a They Might Be Giants show at the Bowery Ballroom, Flansburgh's ride was involved in a collision with a drunk driver. Flansburgh had several broken ribs, many of which had multiple fractures, but no vital organs were involved. The following day, bandmate John Linnell posted a statement on Twitter.

Instruments
Flansburgh frequently plays a red Gibson ES-335, a sonic blue Fender Telecaster, a candy apple red Fender Jazzmaster, and a goldtop Gibson Les Paul. He is known for his unique, custom-made gold Mojo guitar, known as the "Chessmaster". He designed the body himself, taking inspiration from the geometric shapes of old guitar cases.

References

External links
 
  – more detailed information on Flansburgh
 

1960 births
American male singers
American rock guitarists
American male guitarists
Antioch College alumni
Grammy Award winners
Living people
People from Lincoln, Massachusetts
Pratt Institute alumni
Singers from Massachusetts
Songwriters from Massachusetts
They Might Be Giants members
Guitarists from Massachusetts
20th-century American guitarists
Lincoln-Sudbury Regional High School alumni
George Washington University alumni